Jacqueline Ann "Jacquie" Lee (born June 25, 1997) is an American pop singer from Colts Neck, New Jersey. She is best known for being the runner-up of Season 5 of NBC's singing competition The Voice in 2013 as part of Christina Aguilera's team and as a solo artist signed to Atlantic Records. Lee recently started releasing music under her given name, Jacquie.

Early life
Lee was born in Colts Neck Township, New Jersey to parents Denise and Richard Lee. She attended Ranney School in Tinton Falls, New Jersey and has two siblings: an older sister named Nicole and a younger brother named Richie, who attends Cedar Drive Middle 
School. She has Italian ancestry.

Career

2013: The Voice

At the blind auditions on September 24, 2013, Lee performed Amy Winehouse's "Back to Black," persuading Christina Aguilera and Blake Shelton to turn their chairs. Lee chose Aguilera and remained on her team the entire season. In the Battle rounds, Lee was paired with Briana Cuoco where they sang the song "House of the Rising Sun," and advanced. During the Knockout round, Lee sang "Stompa" by Serena Ryder against Anthony Paul and Christina selected her to move on to the Live Playoffs, sending Paul home. 
Lee continued through the Live Rounds and during the Top 5, got an iTunes bonus for reaching the Top 10 overall songs with her studio version of "Angel" by Sarah McLachlan. In the Finals, Lee again received an iTunes bonus from reaching the No. 9 position with her recording of the Jennifer Holliday song "And I Am Telling You I'm Not Going." On December 17, 2013 she was declared to have come in 2nd place behind winner Tessanne Chin.

 – Studio version of performance reached the top 10 on iTunes

2014–present: After The Voice and Broken Ones EP
After the show, Lee was signed to Lyor Cohen's Label, 300 Entertainment, in partnership with Atlantic Records. She performed her debut single, "Broken Ones," on the Top 5 Results of season 6 of The Voice on May 13, 2014. This was the first time the song was performed and her first time returning to the show since being a contestant.  The song was released to iTunes the same day. It was written by Dana Parish and Andy Hollander. Although the song did not enter the Billboard Hot 100, it managed to peak at number 36 on the Pop Digital Songs.

Lee also took part in The Voice Summer Tour 2014, a summer tour starting on June 21 in San Antonio, Texas and concluding in Redmond, Washington on August 2, 2014. She was joined by winner Tessanne Chin, finalist Will Champlin, season 1's runner-up Dia Frampton, along with season 6 Winner Josh Kaufman, runner-up Jake Worthington, and third place finalist Christina Grimmie. She was also joined by Kristen Merlin, a Top 5 finalist, and Jake Barker, a top 20 finalist.

It was announced on September 29 that Lee would be releasing her 'Broken Ones' EP on October 21, 2014 and an iTunes pre-order was available on October 6. A lyric video for "Tears Fall" was premiered on October 10 on MTV.

On April 20, 2015, the official music video for "Tears Fall" was exclusively premiered on MTV. The video was filmed at Zsa Zsa Gabor's mansion in Los Angeles, and was directed by Blair Waters.

In early 2016, Lee was featured on Cash Cash's single, "Aftershock," which premiered on January 29, 2016.

Lee released a digital EP, The Only One, in late 2017. At this point, she started simply going by Jacquie, as opposed to Jacquie Lee.

She followed that up with two digital EPs in 2020, Infinity and Rinascita.

After working on early demos, Lee was cast as the singing voice of Tiera Skovbye's character, Polly Cooper, on the project Riverdale, with the episode "Chapter Ninety-Four: Next to Normal".

Influences
Lee has cited her coach, Christina Aguilera, as a major influence. She has referenced Aguilera as she stated, "[I]t was really surreal, and it was a dream come true because I always idolized her from the start." Lee has also cited Michael Jackson, Jackson 5, Nirvana and Lana Del Rey as influences.

Discography

Soundtrack albums

Extended plays

Singles

As lead artist

As featured artist

Promotional singles

Notes

Other appearances

Releases from The Voice

References

External links

Jacquie Lee on Twitter

1997 births
The Voice (franchise) contestants
American women country singers
American country singer-songwriters
Living people
21st-century American singers
Atlantic Records artists
American people of Italian descent
People from Colts Neck Township, New Jersey
Ranney School alumni
Singer-songwriters from New Jersey
21st-century American women singers
Country musicians from New Jersey